Peter Jakob Freiherr Clodt von Jürgensburg, known in Russian as Pyotr Karlovich Klodt (5 June 1805, Saint Petersburg – 25 November 1867, Klevenoye, Vyborg Governorate), was a favourite sculptor of Nicholas I of Russia.

Biography
Klodt belonged to a distinguished family of Baltic Germans, the Clodt von Jürgensburgs. The family's origin remains unknown, but many speculate that it originated in Westphalia. Klodt started his career as a professional artillery officer and amateur sculptor. He attended classes at the Imperial Academy of Arts in Saint Petersburg, where his mastery in depicting horses eventually won him the rank of academician and the praise of the Emperor. As legend has it, Nicholas I remarked of Klodt that he "creates horses finer than any prize stallion does".

Klodt's most famous group of equestrian statues, the Horse Tamers, was installed at the Anichkov Bridge in 1851. He also produced the bronze statue of Ivan Krylov in the Summer Garden (1848–55). It was the first monument to a poet erected in the Russian Empire.

Klodt collaborated with Vasily Demut-Malinovsky on the statue of Saint Vladimir in Kiev (installed in 1853) and the statuary for the Narva Triumphal Gate. He also sculpted a quadriga above the portico of the Bolshoi Theatre in Moscow.

Klodt's last significant work was a posthumous tribute to his patron, a horse statue for the equestrian Monument to Nicholas I on Saint Isaac's Square. Installed in 1856–1859, it was the first equestrian statue in the world with only two support-points (the rear feet of the horse). Even the Bolsheviks, who destroyed the memorials to Nicholas I across Russia, did not dare to demolish this unique statue.

Klodt died in his estate in the Grand Duchy of Finland (autonomous state of the Russian Empire) on 20 November 1867. His son and nephew Mikhail continued the artistic traditions of the family and became notable painters of the Peredvizhniki school.

See also

 Kasli iron sculpture

References

Sources

Further reading 
Петров В. Н. Пётр Карлович Клодт, 1805—1867. Leningrad, 1985.
Клодт Г. А. Лепил и отливал Петр Клодт... Moscow, 1989.

1805 births
1867 deaths
Russian male sculptors
Baltic-German people
Artists from Saint Petersburg
19th-century sculptors from the Russian Empire
19th-century male artists from the Russian Empire
Recipients of the Pour le Mérite (civil class)
Burials at Tikhvin Cemetery